Vic Frank (April 4, 1927 – April 6, 2010) was an American athlete. He competed in the men's discus throw at the 1948 Summer Olympics.

He competed at the 1953 Maccabiah Games.

References

1927 births
2010 deaths
Athletes (track and field) at the 1948 Summer Olympics
American male discus throwers
Olympic track and field athletes of the United States
Place of birth missing
Competitors at the 1953 Maccabiah Games
Maccabiah Games competitors for the United States
Maccabiah Games athletes (track and field)
20th-century American people